= State Security Apparatus =

State Security Apparatus is the highest authority on state security matters of the United Arab Emirates. It was established in 1974. It mass arrests campaign launched in 2013 Herein disappearance, torture, and arbitrary detention perpetrated. It caused the disappearance of human rights defender Ahmed Mansoor in 2017. He was tortured by SSA agents. Th SSA is under direct control of the UAE president. The SSA is allowed to establish offices in other countries. The 2014 UAE Counterterrorism Law any acts of public dissent with terrorism. State Security Apparatus has punished the families of activists, both detained and living abroad. Its work was outlined in Federal Law No. 2 of 2003.
